Charles R. Barnard (March 13, 1883 – July 11, 1948) was a member of the Wisconsin State Assembly.

Biography
Barnard was born on March 13, 1883, in Brillion, Wisconsin. He graduated from Brillion High School. Barnard died on July 11, 1948.

Career
Barnard was a member of the Assembly from 1941 until his death. Previously, he was an unsuccessful candidate for the Assembly in 1938. He was a Republican.

References

See also
The Political Graveyard

People from Brillion, Wisconsin
Republican Party members of the Wisconsin State Assembly
1883 births
1948 deaths
20th-century American politicians